"Hanging on to Nothing"  is a song by Swedish singer Måns Zelmerlöw. The song was released as a digital download on 26 August 2016 through Warner Music Group as the second single from his seventh studio album Chameleon (2016). The song did not enter the Swedish Singles Chart, but peaked to number 2 on the Sweden Heatseeker Songs. Zelmerlöw also released a bilingual English/French version titled "Rien que nous deux (Hanging on to Nothing)" aimed at French-speaking markets.

Music video
A lyric video to accompany the release of "Hanging on to Nothing" was first released onto YouTube on 2 September 2016 at a total length of three minutes and twenty-one seconds.
The music video for the track was released on 8 June 2017. It was filmed in Warsaw, Poland, and directed by Mikeadelica.

Track listing

Chart performance

Weekly charts

Release history

References

2015 songs
2016 singles
Måns Zelmerlöw songs
English-language Swedish songs
Songs written by Måns Zelmerlöw